The Weetalibah Nature Reserve is a  protected area in Central West New South Wales, Australia. Created in August 1968, it supports narrow-leaved ironbark, white cypress, broad-leaved ironbark and tumbledown gum. Mugga ironbark and red stringybark are also present.

References

Nature reserves in New South Wales
Protected areas established in 1968
1968 establishments in Australia